Wallsee-Sindelburg is a town in the district of Amstetten in Lower Austria in Austria.

Geography
Wallsee-Sindelburg lies in the northwest part of the Mostviertel in Lower Austria, south of the West autobahn on the Danube River. About 26 percent of the municipality is forested.

References

Cities and towns in Amstetten District